, better known by his stage name Government Alpha, is a Japanese noise musician.

Partial discography
Albums
 1969/1999 (1999)
 Alphaville (1999)
 Sporadic Spectra (1999)
 Aerial Patrol EP (2002)
 Artificial Pomegranate (2003)
 Snappish Saurel (2003)
 Strange Days (2003)
 Prospective Massacre (2005)
 Strange Days 2 (2005)
 Ignis Fatuus (2005)
 Venomous Cumulus Cloud (2007)
 Subtle Drugs (2010 Neon Blossom Records)

Split releases
 Saturday Night Groove Sessions with Jazzkammer (2002)
 Radiation Snowfall with Bastard Noise (2003)
 Planet of Fluctuation with MSBR (2003)
 Das Methadonprogramm with Azoikum (2005)

References

External links
Government Alpha at Bandcamp
Government Alpha at Blogger
Government Alpha at SoundCloud
Government Alpha at Tumblr
Government Alpha at Twitter
GX Jupitter-Larsen & Government Alpha mp3 collaboration

Japanese experimental musicians
Noise musicians
Living people
Year of birth missing (living people)